Savas Dimopoulos (born 1952) is a particle physicist at Stanford University. He worked at CERN from 1994 to 1997. Dimopoulos is well known for his work on constructing theories beyond the Standard Model.

Life
He was born an ethnic Greek in Istanbul, Turkey and later moved to Athens due to ethnic tensions in Turkey during the 1950s and 1960s.

Education and career
Dimopoulos studied as an undergraduate at the University of Houston.  He went to the University of Chicago and studied under Yoichiro Nambu for his doctoral studies.  After completing his Ph.D. in 1979, he briefly went to Columbia University before taking a faculty position at Stanford University in 1980. During 1981 and 1982 he was also affiliated with the University of Michigan, Harvard University and the University of California, Santa Barbara. From 1994 to 1997 he was on leave from Stanford University and was employed by CERN.

Dimopoulos is well known for his work on constructing theories beyond the Standard Model, which are currently being searched for and tested at particle colliders like LHC at CERN and at experiments all over the world. For example, in 1981 he proposed a softly broken SU(5) GUT model with Howard Georgi, which is one of the foundational papers of the Minimal Supersymmetric Standard Model (MSSM). He also proposed the ADD model of large extra dimensions with Nima Arkani-Hamed and Gia Dvali.

Awards
In 2006, the American Physical Society awarded Dimopoulos the Sakurai Prize, "For his creative ideas on dynamical symmetry breaking, supersymmetry, and extra spatial dimensions, which have shaped theoretical research on TeV-scale physics, thereby inspiring a wide range of experiments." In 2006, he received the Caterina Tomassoni and Felice Pietro Chisesi Prize at the University of Rome, Italy. "The prize recognizes and encourages outstanding achievements in physics. Dimopoulos was lauded by the Tomassoni Committee as "one of the leading figures in theoretical particle physics. His proposal of the supersymmetric standard model has aided the understanding of high-energy physics mechanisms."

He appeared in the 2013 documentary film Particle Fever, about the work of the Large Hadron Collider.

He is a member of the U. S. National Academy of Sciences.

Work
 Baryogenesis at the GUT scale
 Early work on technicolor
 Early work on soft supersymmetry breaking and Gauge coupling unification in the MSSM
 Moduli-mediated millimeter scale forces
 "ADD model" of large extra dimensions, with Nima Arkani-Hamed and Gia Dvali
 Split supersymmetry

References

External links
 Papers in the INSPIRE-HEP database.
 Faculty page at Stanford.

1952 births
People associated with CERN
Greek academics
Greek emigrants to the United States
20th-century Greek physicists
Constantinopolitan Greeks
Harvard University staff
J. J. Sakurai Prize for Theoretical Particle Physics recipients
Living people
Particle physicists
Scientists from Istanbul
Stanford University Department of Physics faculty
Turkish people of Greek descent
University of Chicago alumni
University of Houston alumni
University of Michigan alumni
Members of the United States National Academy of Sciences
Scientists from Athens
Academics from Istanbul